Platylister foliaceus is a species of clown beetles belonging to the family Histeridae.

Description
Body is shiny black and very flat.

Distribution
This species is present in tropical Africa (Guinea, Kenya, South Africa, Tanzania, Gambia).

References

 Mazur, Slawomir (1999) Preliminary studies upon the Platysoma complex (Col. Histeridae), Annals of Warsaw Agricultural University-SGGW, Forestry and Wood Technology, no. 49

External links
 Coléoptères du Senegal

Histeridae
Beetles described in 1811